The Lexington Red Sox were a minor league baseball team, based in Lexington, Nebraska from 1956 to 1958. The Lexington Red Sox played exclusively as members of the short–season Class D level Nebraska State League, winning the 1956 league championship. The Red Sox played as a minor league affiliate of the Boston Red Sox, hosting home games at the Dawson County Fairgrounds Park.

History
Based in Lexington, Nebraska, and Dawson County, Nebraska, the Lexington Red Sox were a Class D level affiliate of the Boston Red Sox that played in the Nebraska State League from 1956 to 1958. The Lexington Red Sox played their home games at the Dawson County Fairgrounds Park. Lexington won the Nebraska State League Championship in 1956. The team disbanded after the 1958 season when the league reduced from eight teams to six teams, with Lexington and the Superior Senators disbanding.

The 1956 Lexington Red Sox captured the Nebraska State League Championship in their first season. Opening day drew 1,900 fans, as Lexington defeated the Holdrege White Sox 10–7. The Lexington Red Sox ended the 1956 season with a record of 41–22, placing 1st in the league standings under manager Danny Doyle. The Red Sox finished 3.0 games ahead of the 2nd place Grand Island Athletics in the final standings, as the league had no playoffs. The Red Sox drew 28,393 for the season, an average 901, to Dawson County Fairgrounds Park.

The Lexington Red Sox narrowly missed defending their championship in 1957, as the team finished in a 2nd place tie, just 0.5 behind.> Lexington finished with a 33–23 record, the same as the Holdrege White Sox in a tie for 2nd place. The Champion Grand Island Athletics finished 1st with a record of 33–22. Jack Kaiser was the Lexington Manager in 1957. Season attendance was 24,218, an average of 865 per game.</ref>

In their final season, the 1958 Lexington Red Sox placed 5th in the eight–team Nebraska State League. Lexington finished with a 30–33 record, playing again under manager Jack Kaiser. In their final season at Dawson County Fairgrounds Park, the Red Sox had season attendance of 2,838, an average of 408 per home game. Lexington folded after the 1958 season, as the Nebraska State League reduced to six teams.

Lexington, Nebraska has not hosted another minor league team.

The ballpark
The Lexington Red Sox were noted to have played their minor league home games at the Dawson County Fairgrounds Park. The ball field had a dirt infield and utilized the existing raceway grandstands at the fairgrounds. Today, the grandstands are still in use at the Dawson County Fairgrounds for the Dawson County Raceway. The location is 1000 Plum Creek Parkway, Lexington, Nebraska.

Timeline

Year–by–year record

Notable alumni
 Danny Doyle (1956, MGR) 
 Jack Kaiser (1957–1958, MGR)
 Bill Spanswick (1958)

See also
Lexington Red Sox players

References

External link
Baseball Reference

Baseball teams established in 1956
Defunct minor league baseball teams
Sports clubs disestablished in 1958
1956 establishments in Nebraska
1958 disestablishments in Nebraska
Defunct baseball teams in Nebraska
Professional baseball teams in Nebraska
Boston Red Sox minor league affiliates
Dawson County, Nebraska
Baseball teams disestablished in 1958
Nebraska State League teams